Horacio de Almeida (born 16 April 1975 in Uato-Lari, Viqueque, Timor-Leste) is Deputy Provedor of Human Rights in the Office of the Provedor for Human Rights and Justice, or Provedoria dos Direitos Humanos e Justiça (PDHJ), in Timor-Leste. He has held this position since January 2015.

Professional life 

De Almeida worked with various UN Missions to Timor-Leste (UNMISET, UNOTIL and UNMIT) while also teaching in the University of Dili for over 5 years. He worked as a Human Rights Adviser to the Ministry of Health of Timor-Leste on legal and procurement issues. In January 2015 he was appointed as Deputy Provedor for Human Rights at the Office of the Provedor for Human Rights and Justice.

References

1975 births
Living people
Politics of East Timor